This is a list of episodes from the ninth season of Shark Tank.

Episodes

Guest sharks this season include Spanx founder Sara Blakely, Virgin Group founder Richard Branson, brand marketer Rohan Oza, TV personality Bethenny Frankel, and former MLB star Alex Rodriguez.

The series moved to Sunday nights for this season. After the cancellation of Ten Days in the Valley, and with the March arrival of ABC's reboot of American Idol, the majority of episodes aired back-to-back in two-hour blocks.

References

External links 
 Official website
 

9
2017 American television seasons
2018 American television seasons